WKGX (1080 AM 104.5 FM) is a radio station broadcasting a classic hits format. It is licensed to Lenoir, North Carolina, United States.  The station is owned by Foothills Radio Group.

External links

Classic hits radio stations in the United States
KGX
1969 establishments in North Carolina
Radio stations established in 1969
KGX